The 2009 Waikato Bay of Plenty Magic season saw Waikato Bay of Plenty Magic compete in the 2009 ANZ Championship. With a team coached by Noeline Taurua and co-captained by Joline Henry and Irene van Dyk, Magic finished the regular season as runners-up to Melbourne Vixens. They subsequently lost the major semi-final to Vixens and the preliminary final to Adelaide Thunderbirds.

Players

Player movements
In January 2009, Amigene Metcalfe announced her retirement. In March 2009, Joline Henry and Irene van Dyk were named as co-captains. Leana de Bruin returned to Magic after a season with Northern Mystics, while Frances Solia transferred from Central Pulse. The all-international-level starting line-up drew concerns regarding the uneven distribution of top players among New Zealand franchises and allegations of salary cap breaches.

Roster

Pre-season tournaments
In early March 2009 Waikato Bay of Plenty Magic played in the 2009 SOPA Cup, hosted by Netball New South Wales at the Sydney Olympic Park Sports Centre. Later in the month Magic hosted and won the Waipa Pre-Season Tournament, defeating Northern Mystics 53–37 in the final.

Regular season

Fixtures and results
Round 1

Round 2

Round 3

Round 4

Round 5

Round 6
 

Round 7

Round 8

Round 9
 received a bye.
Round 10

Round 11

Round 12

Round 13

Round 14

Final table

Playoffs

Major semi-final

Preliminary final

Gallery

References

2009
2009 ANZ Championship season
2009 in New Zealand netball